The national flag of Bangladesh,  was adopted officially on 17 January 1972. It consists of a red disc or sun on top of a dark green banner. The red disc is offset slightly toward the hoist so that it appears centered when the flag is flying. While there are many interpretations, according to Shib Narayan Das who put the map on the first flag design, green on the flag represented the landscape and the red circle represented the sun, symbolising a new day and end of oppression.

The flag is based on a similar flag used during the Bangladesh Liberation War of 1971, which had a yellow map of the country inside the red disc. In 1972 this map was removed from the flag. One reason given was the difficulty for rendering the map correctly on both sides of the flag. The civil ensign and naval ensign place it in the canton of a red or white field, respectively.

Origin
The first version of the flag was designed and made by a section of student leaders and activists of Swadheen Bangla Nucleus on 6 June 1970, at room 108 of Iqbal Hall (now Sergeant Zahurul Haq hall), Dhaka University; students involved with the design were namely Kazi Aref Ahmed, ASM Abdur Rab, Shahjahan Siraj, Manirul Islam (Marshal Moni), Swapan Kumar Choudhury, Quamrul Alam Khan Khasru, Hasanul Haq Inu, and Yousuf Salahuddin Ahmed. The flag was made from clothes donated by Bazlur Rahman Lasker, the owner of Apollo Tailors, Dhaka New Market.

A map of East Pakistan (now Bangladesh) was first traced on a tracing paper from an atlas by Hasanul Haq Inu, Yousuf Salahuddin Ahmed and Enamul Haq, at Enamul's room (312) in Quaid-I Azam Hall (now Titumir Hall), EPUET (now BUET). Later the map was painted in the red circle by Shib Narayan Das. On 2 March 1971, this initial version of the flag was hoisted in Bangladesh for the first time at Dhaka University, by student leader A. S. M. Abdur Rab, the then Vice President of Dhaka University Students' Union (DUCSU) The flag was conceived so as to exclude the star and crescent considered as symbols of West Pakistan (now Pakistan).

On 13 January 1972 the flag was modified. The map from the center was removed, and the red disk moved towards the hoist so as to be visually centered when the flag is in flight on a mast.

Symbolism
According to CIA World Fact Book and official descriptions, the green used in the flag represents the lushness of the green landscape of the country and the red disk of the flag represents the blood the Bengalis shed during the Bangladesh Liberation War and the blood of those who died for the independence of Bangladesh. An alternative description says that the green background represents the youth power and progress, while the red disk represents the revolution and renaissance. The circularity of the red design indicates the rising sun, similar to the Japanese flag.

Design

According to Bangladeshi government specifications, following is the specification of the national flag:
The flag will be in bottle green and rectangular in size in the proportion of length to width of 10:6, with a red circle in near middle.
The red circle will have a radius of one-fifth of the length of the flag. Its centre will be placed on the intersecting point of the perpendicular drawn from the nine-twentieth part of the length of the flag, and the horizontal line drawn through the middle of its width.
The green base of the flag will be of Procion Brilliant Green H-2RS 50 parts per 1000. The red circular part will be of Procion Brilliant Orange H-2RS 60 parts per 1000.
Depending on the size of the building the flag sizes will be ; ; .

Protocol 

The national flag of Bangladesh is flown on all working days on important government buildings and offices, e.g., the president house, legislative assembly buildings, etc. All ministries and the secretariat buildings of Bangladesh, offices of the high court, courts of district and session judges, offices of the commissioners of divisions, deputy commissioner/collectors, chairman, upazila parishad, central and district jails, police stations, primary, secondary and higher secondary level educational institutions and other buildings notified by the government from time to time.
Ministers of state and persons accorded the status of a minister of state, deputy ministers and persons accorded the status of a deputy minister while on tour outside the capital within the country or abroad are entitled to fly the flag on their motor vehicles and vessels.

Official residences
The following persons must fly the flag on their official residence:

 The President of Bangladesh 
 The Prime Minister of Bangladesh 
 The Speaker of the Parliament of Bangladesh
 The Chief Justice of Bangladesh
 All Cabinet Ministers
 Chief Whip of Bangladesh
 Deputy Speaker of the Parliament
 The leader of the Opposition in Parliament
 Ministers of States
 Deputy Ministers
 Heads of Bangladeshi Diplomatic or Consular Missions in foreign countries
 Chairmen of Chittagong hill tracts (district offices of Rangamati, Khagrachari and Bandarban)

Motor vehicles and vessels
The following persons are entitled to fly the flag on their motor vehicles and vessels:
 The President of Bangladesh 
 The Prime Minister of Bangladesh 
 The Speaker of the Parliament
 The Chief of Justice of Bangladesh
 All Cabinet Ministers
 Chief Whip
 Deputy Speaker of the Parliament
 The leader of the Opposition in Parliament
 Heads of Bangladeshi Diplomatic or Consular Missions in foreign countries

Display 

The national flag of Bangladesh is flown on public and private buildings throughout Bangladesh and the office premises of Bangladeshi diplomatic missions and consular posts on the following days and occasions:

 Independence Day on 26 March.
 Victory Day on 16 December.
 Birthday of the Islamic prophet Muhammad.
 Any other day notified by the Government of Bangladesh.

Half-mast 
The national flag of Bangladesh is flown at half-mast on the following days:
 National Shaheed Day, now the International Mother Language Day, on 21 February
 National Mourning Day of Bangladesh on 15 August. 
 All other days notified by the Government of Bangladesh.

World record
On 16 December 2013, the 42nd Victory Day of Bangladesh, 27,117 people gathered at the National Parade Ground in Dhaka's Sher-e-Bangla Nagar and created a "human flag" which was recorded in Guinness Book of World Records as the world's largest human national flag. This feat was short, however, as India topped the record on 7 December 2014 with 43,830 people participating to achieve the new world record for largest human national flag.

In July 2021, Saimon Imran Hayder used 16,000 envelopes to create a 240m2 Bangladesh flag at the InterContinental Dhaka which was also a Guinness World Records attempt.

Historical flags

Pre-colonial states

British India and independence

See also

 List of Bangladeshi flags
 National symbols of Bangladesh

References

External links

 
Similarities between flags of Bangladesh, Japan, and Palau

 
Bangladesh
Flags of Bangladesh
Bangladesh